Suzanna Clarke is an Australian author, photographer and journalist.

Life and work
Clarke was born in New Zealand in 1961, lived in Brisbane, Australia, and now lives in Fez, Morocco.

She worked as a photographer, reviewer, travel and feature writer for The Courier-Mail in Brisbane Australia where she is now the Arts Editor. She has been a professional photographer for over twenty years. Her first project, on children with disabilities, was exhibited in Sydney when she was sixteen. After studying contemporary dance in Amsterdam in her early twenties and travelling extensively, she returned to a BA communications degree at the University of Technology, Sydney. She has since completed an MA in creative writing at Queensland University of Technology and worked there as a part-time lecturer.

During the late 1980s and early 1990s, Clarke worked as a freelance photographer for editorial, commercial and government clients. These included The Australian newspaper, The Age newspaper, Travel and Life magazine (now Conde Nast Traveler), New Scientist, Illustrated Science (Scandinavia), The Bulletin/Newsweek, Australian Country Style, WWF, The Australian Tourism Commission and The NSW & NT Tourism Commissions.

In 2006 Clarke completed a book on the restoration of their house in the old medina of the Moroccan city of Fes for Penguin books. The book A House in Fez has been published in Australia, New Zealand, the UK and the USA. A Korean language version was due in 2009. In 2015 she helped establish a children's library in Fez.

References

Australian photojournalists
Australian women journalists
Australian journalists
Living people
1961 births
New Zealand emigrants to Australia
New Zealand photojournalists
Queensland University of Technology alumni
New Zealand women photographers
Australian women photographers
Writers from Brisbane
Women photojournalists